Cecil Thomas (9 September 1926 – 1 September 1996) was a Guyanese cricketer. He played in thirteen first-class matches for British Guiana from 1946 to 1957.

See also
 List of Guyanese representative cricketers

References

External links
 

1926 births
1996 deaths
Guyanese cricketers
Guyana cricketers
Sportspeople from Georgetown, Guyana